The Nepal earthquake may refer to:

 1833 Bihar–Nepal earthquake
 1934 Nepal–India earthquake
 1980 Nepal earthquake
 1988 Nepal earthquake
 April 2015 Nepal earthquake, a magnitude 7.8 earthquake, killing thousands
 May 2015 Nepal earthquake, a magnitude 7.3 aftershock of the April earthquake
 List of aftershocks of April 2015 Nepal earthquake

See also
 List of earthquakes in Nepal